The 1969 South African Grand Prix, formally the Third AA Grand Prix of South Africa (Afrikaans: Derde AA Suid-Afrikaanse Grand Prix), was a Formula One motor race held at Kyalami Circuit on 1 March 1969. It was race 1 of 11 in both the 1969 World Championship of Drivers and the 1969 International Cup for Formula One Manufacturers. The 80-lap race was won by Matra driver Jackie Stewart after he started from fourth position. Graham Hill finished second for the Lotus team and McLaren driver Denny Hulme came in third.

Background 

In the weeks leading up to the first Formula One race of the  season, entries were being announced for the race, with all the teams, apart from Ferrari expected to nominate two drivers for the race. Enzo Ferrari, the managing director of the team he founded, announced that Ferrari were only going to nominate one driver for the race. To most people's surprise, Ferrari at first nominated two drivers for the race without explanation. However, the decision was later changed, with only Chris Amon nominated eventually for Ferrari. Brabham, BRM, Lotus, Matra and McLaren all chose to nominate two drivers for the race meeting.

Classification

Qualifying 

Surtees's qualifying time was excluded as he had started at the back of the grid.

Race

Championship standings after the race 

Drivers' Championship standings

Constructors' Championship standings

Note: Only the top five positions are included for both sets of standings.

References

Further reading

South African Grand Prix
Grand Prix
South African Grand Prix
March 1969 sports events in Africa